The Harley Golden Gospels, British Library, Harley MS 2788, is a Carolingian illuminated manuscript Gospel book produced in about 800–825, probably in Aachen, Germany.  It is one of the manuscripts attributed to the "Ada School", which is named after the Ada Gospels.  It has four pairs of full-page Evangelist portraits and illuminated "Incipit" pages, canon tables, and other illuminations. As with other examples of the Codex Aureus (i.e. golden books), the text is written in gold ink.

See also
 Aachen Gospels
 Bible of San Paolo fuori le Mura
 Codex Aureus (disambiguation)

References

Gospel Books
Harleian Collection
Carolingian illuminated manuscripts
9th-century illuminated manuscripts